Rhizospalax is a genus of extinct rodent from Europe thought to be distantly related to modern beavers.  It is the only member of the family Rhizospalacidae.

References

Oligocene rodents
Prehistoric mammals of Europe
Fossil taxa described in 1919